is a railway station on the Kyūdai Main Line in Kokonoe, Ōita Prefecture, Japan.

Lines

Layout 
The station consists of two side platforms serving two tracks at grade. The station building is a small, modern, functional concrete structure which is unstaffed and serves only as a waiting room. From the station building, a short flight of steps leads down to platform 1 which is at a lower level. Access to the opposite side platform is by means of a level crossing with ramps.

Adjacent stations

History
The Daito Railway was nationalized on 1 December 1922, after which Japanese Government Railways (JGR) undertook phased westward expansion of the track which, at the time, it had designated as the Daito Line. By 1925, the track had reached . Subsequently, the track was extended further west and Noya was opened as the new western terminus on 26 November 1926. On 15 November 1934, when the Daito Line had linked up with the Kyudai Main Line further west, JGR designated the station as part of the Kyudai Main Line. With the privatization of Japanese National Railways (JNR), the successor of JGR, on 1 April 1987, the station came under the control of JR Kyushu.

Passenger statistics
In fiscal 2015, there were a total of 2,444 boarding passengers, giving a daily average of 7 passengers.

See also
 List of railway stations in Japan

References

External links
Noya (JR Kyushu)

Railway stations in Ōita Prefecture
Railway stations in Japan opened in 1926